Noémi Gaál (born 10 October 1970 in Sárospatak, Hungary) is a Hungarian TV personality and presenter for TV2 and has been a contestant on the Hungarian reality show Ázsia Expressz 1.

References

Hungarian television personalities
1970 births
Living people
Reality television participants
Hungarian television presenters
Hungarian women television presenters
People from Sárospatak